Stefaan Engels (born 7 April 1961, Ghent, Belgium), also known as "marathon man", is a Belgian marathoner and triathlete, the first man to run the marathon distance 365 consecutive times in a single year. He previously held the record for the most Ironman Triathlons in a year with 20 over 2007 and 2008 - see James Lawrence (triathlete)

Engels averaged around four hours to complete each marathon with the best time of 3 hours and 21 minutes.  He ran  during his marathons over 2010. Engels said that a slow pace was the key. Before him, the record was held 
by  Ricardo Abad Martínez of Spain with 150 marathons in a row in 2009. Abad is the current world record holder.

Of his feats, Engels described: "I don't regard my marathon year as torture. It's more like a regular job...I am running just as Joe Average goes to work on Monday morning, whether or not he feels like it. I don't always feel like running, but when I am done, I take a shower, have some physiotherapy for an hour, and that wraps up my day."

Growing up Engels had asthma and was instructed to avoid activity.

See also
Serge Girard, holder of the world record distance traveled on foot in one year

References

External links
 Official Marathon Man 365 website
 UniversalSports.com photo gallery
 Watchmojo.com video interview and profile

1961 births
Living people
Belgian male long-distance runners
Belgian male marathon runners
Sportspeople from Ghent
Belgian male triathletes